Top Quality was an American rapper formally signed to RCA Records in the early 1990s. He was the first rapper from White Plains to get a major label record deal.

After appearing in The Source magazine's  Unsigned Hype, a column dedicated to finding unsigned talent, Top Quality eventually caught the eye of EPMD's Parrish "PMD" Smith, who made him a member of the rap collective Hit Squad and was subsequently signed a deal with RCA Records. His debut album, Magnum Opus was released in May 1994 and was executively produced by Smith himself. The album, however, was a commercial failure. Unlike other Hit Squad releases at the time, Magnum Opus failed to sell many copies and peaked at only 95 on the Billboard R&B charts.

After being released from RCA, Top Quality appeared on PMD's Shade Business in 1994 and 3rd Eye's Planets in 1998.

Discography

References

African-American male rappers
Living people
People from White Plains, New York
Rappers from New York (state)
Year of birth missing (living people)
21st-century American rappers
21st-century American male musicians
21st-century African-American musicians
Hit Squad members